Gökmedrese or Gök Medrese, is a 13th-century Anadolu Selçuklu medrese, in Tokat, Turkey. This splendid piece of Seljuk architecture for years hosted the "Tokat Müzesi" (Museum of Tokat), an archaeological and ethnographical museum, until that moved in 2012 to a location in the bedesten area.

See also
 Hatuniye Külliyesi

Gallery

References

Buildings and structures in Tokat
Seljuk architecture
Madrasas in Turkey
Buildings and structures of the Sultanate of Rum
Archaeological museums in Turkey
Ethnographic museums in Turkey
13th-century madrasas